The kong nyee (គងញី literally feminine gong) is a bossed gong from Ratanakiri province in northeastern Cambodia. The instruments vary in size, for different pitches.

The instrument is a round bronze-brass alloy plate with a round lump in the center, called a boss (like a shield boss) in English. The Khmer word translates to "breast". Musicians strike the boss with a  mallet to get the best sound from the gong. The "male gong", kong chmol, lacks the boss in the center.

References

External links
Photo, line of possible kong nyee gongs, used in group music.
Video of a gong choir playing bossed gongs such as the kong nyee.
Video showing flat and bossed gongs, possibly the kong chmol and kong nyee.

Hand drums
Cambodian musical instruments